Love Lies in Ashes is the first EP by American deathcore band Carnifex. It was self-released at the end of 2006. On March 13, 2007, online stores such as iTunes and Amazon started selling the MP3 version.

Background
The EP was recorded in 2006 and was released originally on March 13, 2007 through Acropolisrpm Records.

After releasing a self-titled demo through Enclave Records, James and Vargas departed, and were replaced by bassist Steve McMahon and guitarist Travis Whiting, resulting in the EP Love Lies in Ashes. The band signed a deal with This City is Burning Records in 2007 and released their full-length debut, Dead in My Arms.

Track listing

Personnel
Carnifex
Scott Lewis – vocals
Steve McMahon – bass guitar
Travis Whiting – guitar
Shawn Cameron – drums

References

2006 debut EPs
Carnifex (band) albums